Waseem Ahmed (born 1976) is a contemporary miniature painter and visual artist, living and working in Lahore, Punjab, Pakistan.

Biography 
Ahmed attended the National College of Arts in Lahore and received his bachelor's degree in Fine Arts from the Department of Miniature Painting in 2000.

Since 2001, Ahmed is a Visiting Assistant Professor at the Miniature Painting Department of the National College of Arts in Lahore.

In 2014, Ahmed was the first artist-in-residence at the Museum für Asiatische Kunst in Berlin participating in the Humboldt Lab Dahlem project, where he was invited to create a new body of work in dialogue with the permanent collection of the Museum für Asiatische Kunst in Berlin and the city of Berlin. The project also included a retrospective at the Museum für Asiatische Kunst in 2014–2015

Artistic approach 
Combining traditional miniature techniques, such as gouache and gold and silver leaf on wasli paper, with genuine experimental techniques, Ahmed creates finely rendered small and large scale works that address various social, political and cultural issues. His rich vocabulary borrows elements from Asian and European art history and mythology.

Exhibitions 
Waseem Ahmed had his first solo show at the National College of Arts Lahore, Pakistan in 2000.

Ahmed's work was exhibited in Pakistan (Karachi, Lahore, Islamabad) and internationally, including Museum für Asiatische Kunst Berlin, Fukuoka Asian Art Museum (2004), Laurent Delaye Gallery in London, Gowen Contemporary in Geneva, Jason McCoy Gallery in New York, Katmandu Triennale, and the Karachi Biennale.

Collections 
Waseem Ahmed is represented in international collections including the Museum of Asian Art and the British Museum in London.

References

1976 births
Living people
People from Hyderabad, Sindh
Artists from Lahore
National College of Arts alumni
21st-century Pakistani male artists
21st-century Pakistani painters